Stratos Dionysiou (November 8, 1935 – May 11, 1990), nicknamed "To Geraki tis Pistas" (The eagle of the stage), was a Greek singer, composer and lyricist.

Early life
Stratos Dionysiou was born on November 8, 1935 in Nigrita, Serres. He was the son of Angelos and Stasa Dionysios, refugees from Ayvali in Asia Minor. In 1947, he moved to Eptalofos of Ampelokipi, Thessaloniki. A year later, his father passed away. In 1955 he married his childhood love, Georgia Laveni, with whom they had four children: Angelos, Tasoula, Stelios and Diamantis. He was a fan of PAOK.

Singing career

Early career 
At first he sang for free in nightclubs and after working as a peddler and tailor, he debuted as a professional singer at the nightclub "Farida" in Thessaloniki. From his first appearances in the 1950's, Dionysiou attracted the interest of some artists, who urged him to come down to Athens to make more important collaborations.

Dionysiou left Thessaloniki for Athens to further his singing career. He appeared in Nikaia nightclub "Asteras" with well-established singer Kaity Grey and in 1958 recorded his first song, "Parages kai PalatIa" (Shacks and Palaces). A year later he recorded a song by Xristos Kolokotronis, "Ego den eimai enoxos" (I am not Guilty). The song was very successful, because it was released around the same time when Caryl Chessman's execution happened, and people drew connections between the song's lyrics and title and Chessman's death sentence. However, Dionysiou's voice was often mistaken for Stelios Kazantzidis' voice. Dionysiou signed a contract with recording company "Columbia" and started singing songs by Xristos Kolokotronis, Babis Bakalis, Kostas Virvos, and others with some success. He also re-recorded old, pre-war and WW2-era rebetiko-gerne songs by Vassilis Tsitsanis, Yiannis Papaioannou, Giorgos Mitsakis and Manolis Chiotis. Huge success, however, did not come until the late 1960s, when he turned several Akis Panou songs into hits: "Και τι δεν κάνω" (What don't I do), "Γιατί καλέ γειτόνισσα" (Why, my good neighbour?), "Του κόσμου το περίγελο" (The laughing stock of the World), "Εγώ καλά σου τα 'λεγα" (I told you so), "Στο σταθμό του Μονάχου" (At Munich Station), "Ήταν ψεύτικα" (They were false) and many others. During his time working at Columbia, he also sang remakes of Indian songs such as "Kardia mou kaimeni" (My poor heart), remake of the Indian song Duniya mein hum aaye hain, featured in the 1957 movie Mother India.

In the nightclub "SOU-MOU" where he appeared, he was the second most popular singer, he sang along with female singer Anthoula Alifragki. It's the same nightclub where Mimis Plessas heard him in 1969 and after two months he wrote the legendary zeibekiko "Vrehi fotia stin strata mou" (Fire is raining down my path) with lyrics by Lefteris Papadopoulos. The song was featured in the 1970 movie "Oratotis Miden" (Zero Visibility) starring Nikos Kourkoulos. Then Dionysiou released the successful songs "O paliatzis", "Baglamades ki bouzoukia", "Enas aitos gremiste", "Agapi mou epikindini" and "Aphilotimi". In the early 1970s, he collaborated with Haris Alexiou, Lizeta Nikolaou and Sofi Pappa in Backing Vocals. Dionysiou also toured the United States with great success.

Arrest and imprisonment 
In 1973 he was arrested for illegal gun possession and hashish found in his car. He himself claimed that it was a conspiracy of competitors. He was found innocect of gun possesion in 1974, but in 1975, on April 9, the trial of the notorious drug-trafficking case began at the Criminal Court of Thessaloniki. The decision that came out on May 30 sentenced him to imprisonment and exile. He was released thanks to an amnesty from prison in the spring of 1976. At this moment, his colleague and friend Tolis Voskopoulos, who in 1977 wrote and gave him the song "I fell asleep", especially supported him. While in prison, he recorded and released the album "Pali Mazi mas".

Post-Release Career 
The climate in public opinion was heavy. When Dionysiou was released from prison he was faced with rejection. No high-profile company wanted to work with him and no businessman wanted him in their nightclub.

But Stratos did not give up. He persisted and finally managed to return to the music scene with the Minos company. The director of the company at the time was Makis Matsas, who viewed the collaboration with Stratos with great reservations. The prison sentence had discredited Dionysiou's career. But for Matsas, there was another big problem. Stelios Kazantzidis was also recording in Minos at the time, and the coexistence of two big names in the same space might have created problems. After pressure that Matsas received from Dionysiou, they finally signed a contract with discouraging conditions for the singer.

If the first record they would make did not exceed 30,000 sales, their collaboration would stop there. Otherwise, they would make two more records on the same terms. The sales of the first album, which had the title "Ypokrinese" (You are pretending), exceeded 100,000 within a few months. Stratos was rewarded for his persistence. The big "comeback" had taken place and the successes followed one another. "I packed up the things", "You took everything and left", "A thin booth" are just some of the songs that Stratos recorded after prison.

In the 80s, Stratos Dionysiou broke every sales record. He made very big hits, songs that are not only heard today, but come out on records, in re-runs and in covers. They are more or less the songs that everyone once sang and are still heard on the radio today as if they were new. "You took it all", "And say-say", "Listen, my friend", "The people want a song", "She killed me because I loved her", "I am the stranger", "Remember" and many more.

In 1987, he opened his own nightclub named "Stratos", in Filellinon Street.

Personal life 
Dionysiou married Georgia Laveni in 1955 and had four children, Angelos, Stelios, Diamantis and Tasoula Dionysiou. Of Stratos' four children, Angelos, Diamantis and Stelios Dionysiou are also singers. His daughter, Tasoula Dionysiou, passed away in April 2012 at the age of 53. From 1980-1989, while married, he had a relationship with Marina Vlaxaki, a singer who was his backing vocalist.

Political Views 
Although Dionsyiou described himself as a "New Democrat", he believed that everybody was "The same shit", believing that all parties lead to same negative results. He disliked ELAS, due to them letting a security battalion commander named Papoulias escape after he bribed them. He was critical of America's influence in Greece, stating, "I believe Greece is being ordered by the big bosses, the Americans, they have separated us for years and we are like plots of land of America. We will do whatever America wants".

Death
Dionysiou died in Athens on May 11, 1990 as a result of abdominal aortic aneurysm at the age of 54.

His funeral took place in the First Cemetery of Athens. His funeral was attended by hundreds of people as well as other singers and actors. A few hours before his last breath, he was singing in "Stratos", while earlier, that same afternoon, he recorded nine songs for the record "Poios allos" (Who Else) which was released a month after his death, making a sales records. According to Takis Mousafiris, the last song he recorded that day was "Don't leave me alone".

Legacy 
His funeral took the form of lying in state. For some time people were pushing to get close to the singer's body, while there were women who fainted. Many, in order to be able to see, climbed on neighboring graves, causing damage, which was later paid for by the Dionysiou family. "All roads were closed. I mean, I was speechless. I didn't expect so many simple people loved Stratos. He was, after all, the great popular singer", said Giorgos Polychroniadis, who sang together with Dionysiou. People said goodbye to their favorite singer with songs. Stratos Dionysiou's death left behind songs that are still heard today, but also a great void in Greek music. After Dionysiou's death, Notis Sfakianakis released the song "o Stratos" in his honor.

Discography

Posthumorous

References

1935 births
1990 deaths
20th-century Greek male singers
Greek laïko singers
Greek songwriters
Minos EMI artists
Burials at the First Cemetery of Athens
Singers from Thessaloniki
Greek prisoners and detainees
Prisoners and detainees of Greece
People from Nigrita